This is a complete list of members of the United States Senate during the 109th United States Congress listed by seniority, from January 3, 2005, to January 3, 2007.

Order of service is based on the commencement of the senator's first term. Behind this is former service as a senator (only giving the senator seniority within their new incoming class), Vice President, U.S. Representative, Cabinet secretary, or governor of a state. The final factor is the population of their state.

In this congress, Jeff Bingaman was the most senior junior senator and Elizabeth Dole was the most junior senior senator.

Senators who were sworn in during the middle of the two-year congressional term (up until the last senator who was not sworn in early after winning the November 2006 election) are listed at the end of the list with no number.

Terms of service

U.S. Senate seniority list

See also
109th United States Congress
List of members of the United States House of Representatives in the 109th Congress by seniority

Notes

External links
Senate Seniority List

109
109th United States Congress